Minuscule 10 (in the Gregory-Aland numbering), ε 372 (Soden), is a Greek minuscule manuscript of the New Testament, on 275 parchment leaves, dated palaeographically to the 13th century. It has complex contents with full marginalia.

Description 

The codex contains the complete text of the four Gospels. The text is written in one column per page, 24 lines per page. The capital letters in red.

There is also another division according to the smaller Ammonian Sections (in Mark 237 sections, the last in 16:14), with references to the Eusebian Canons.

Text 

The Greek text of the codex, for the most part, is a mixture of text-types, with predominant the Byzantine element. It has also some Alexandrian readings, and some unique readings. It is close textually to Codex Campianus. Aland did not place it in any Category.

According to the Claremont Profile Method it creates textual group M10.

History 

The manuscript came from Byzantium. According to the subscription it was given in 1439 to the Library of Canons Regular at Verona by Dorotheus Archbishop of Mitylene, when he came to the Council of Florence in 1438. The manuscript once belonged to Jean Hurault de Boistaillé (like codices 9, 203, 263, 301, 306, 314). Then it belonged to Archbishop of Reims Le Tellier (1671–1710), like codices 11, 13.

It was used by Ludolph Küster in his edition of the Greek New Testament (as Paris 1).

It was examined by Griesbach and Scholz. Scholz examined only texts of Mark 1-4 and John 5-8. It was examined and described by Paulin Martin. C. R. Gregory saw the manuscript in 1885.

The codex is currently located at the Bibliothèque nationale de France (Gr. 91) at Paris.

See also 

 List of New Testament minuscules
 Textual criticism
 Biblical manuscripts

References

Further reading 

 

Greek New Testament minuscules
13th-century biblical manuscripts
Bibliothèque nationale de France collections